Agridi is a village in the municipal unit of Aroania, Achaea, Greece.  In 2011, it had a population of 92.  The village is situated in a mountainous area, 2 km northwest of Aroania and 19 km southwest of Kalavryta.

Population

See also
List of settlements in Achaea

References

External links
Agridi at the GTP Travel Pages

Populated places in Achaea